Michael Lane may refer to:

Michael Lane (character) (active since 2007), recurring character in Azrael comics
Michael Lane (engineer) (1802–1868), British civil engineer
Michael Lane (Royal Navy officer) (active since 2010), British politician and police commissioner
J. Michael Lane (1936–2020), American epidemiologist
Michael R. Lane (born 1952), American education administrator
Mike Lane (1933–2015), American wrestler
Mike Lane (Magic Mike) (active since 2012), fictional male stripper
Michael Lane Sylvester (born 1951), American operatic tenor
Bronco Lane (Michael Patrick Lane, born 1945), former British Army officer, mountaineer, and author

See also
20564 Michaellane, a minor planet discovered in 1999